Cyanotis cristata is a species of perennial plants in the family Commelinaceae. It is native to Indian Subcontinent, southern China, Southeast Asia, Ethiopia, Socotra, Mauritius, Java, and the Philippines.

Cyanotis cristata is a creeping herb found in sandy or grassy spots. It is common in eastern hills of Nepal.

References

cristata
Flora of Asia
Plants described in 1753
Taxa named by Carl Linnaeus